Okulovo is a rural locality (a village) in Lentyevskoye Rural Settlement, Ustyuzhensky District, Vologda Oblast, Russia. The population was 6 as of 2002.

Geography 
Oryol is the nearest rural locality.

References 

Rural localities in Ustyuzhensky District